The Sawtooth Range is a jagged snow-capped mountain range on central Ellesmere Island, Nunavut, Canada. It lies between the Fosheim Peninsula and the Wolf Valley. The Sawtooth Range is a subrange of the Arctic Cordillera.
It also runs through a Canadian Forces Station, called Eureka, a base used to study atmospheric changes.

Geology

See also
List of mountain ranges

References

External links
Outcrop. • A-river section east of Mount Bridgman, eastern slopes of Sawtooth Range, Fosheim Peninsula, Ellesmere Island

Arctic Cordillera
Mountain ranges of Qikiqtaaluk Region